Vallés (variant: Samartín del Vallés) is one of 41 parishes (administrative divisions) in Villaviciosa, a municipality within the province and autonomous community of Asturias, in northern Spain.

The parroquia has a population of 93 (INE 2008). The postal code is 33310.

Villages and hamlets
 San Martín de Vallés
 Piedrafita
 Sietes

References

Parishes in Villaviciosa